Isidro Luis Martín Solano (born 13 July 1959) is a Spanish rower. He competed at the 1980 Summer Olympics and the 1984 Summer Olympics.

References

1959 births
Living people
Spanish male rowers
Olympic rowers of Spain
Rowers at the 1980 Summer Olympics
Rowers at the 1984 Summer Olympics
Place of birth missing (living people)